The 2019 UST Growling Tigers men's basketball team represented University of Santo Tomas in the 82nd season of the University Athletic Association of the Philippines. The men's basketball tournament for the school year 2019-20 began on September 4, 2019 and the host school for the season was Ateneo de Manila University.

The Tigers made it back to the playoffs for the first time since Season 78 after finishing the double round-robin eliminations at fourth place with 8 wins against 6 losses. The FEU Tamaraws had the same win–loss record but were ranked higher on a superior +6 quotient over UST.

They then eliminated FEU in the first round of the stepladder semifinals and went on to defeat the second-seeded UP Fighting Maroons who held a twice-to-beat advantage over them in the next round to advance to the Finals against the undefeated Ateneo Blue Eagles.

The Blue Eagles went on to sweep the Finals series for an unprecedented 16–0 season and capped a three-peat championship run that began in Season 80. UST, who had nine new players in their roster was the only team to have lost to Ateneo by a solitary point this season. Their first round match ended with a score of 70–71.

Beninese center Soulémane Chabi Yo was named Most Valuable Player of the season, while former Tiger Cubs' one-and-done and mythical team member Mark Nonoy won the Rookie of the Year award. This was the first time in a decade for players from UST to win the MVP and the Rookie of the Year awards. Dylan Ababou was the MVP, while Jeric Teng was the Rookie of the Year in 2009.

Rhenz Abando, a transferee from Pangasinan's Philippine College of Science and Technology was chosen Player of the Week by the UAAP Press Corps for the duration of September 4–8, while team captain CJ Cansino, who had a season-ending ACL injury the previous year got the citation during the week of October 16–20, 2019.

Season records 
UST had an average winning margin of 12.8 points and an average losing margin of 8.7 points.

They had a blowout win over the UE Red Warriors, defeating them 101–73 in the second round of eliminations. Their 101-point output was the highest scored by a team in the season. It eclipsed their opening day record of 95 points which was also against UE. Prior to the game, the Tigers had not scored more than 90 points since Aldin Ayo took over as head coach. It was during the first round of Season 80 when UST scored 91 points in a losing effort to also the Red Warriors on their 11th consecutive loss that dated back to the second round of Season 79.

UST made a record 49 three-point shot attempts in their opening game against UE, 15 of which were by Abando. The Tigers also have the most number of three-point field goals converted with 16, as well as the highest total field goal attempts made in a game with 95, converting also a record high 39 shots.

The team also held the most number of free throw attempts and conversions with 42 and 28 respectively. This was during their second-round game against the Adamson Falcons where both teams committed a combined total of 21 team fouls in the first quarter.

UST also recorded the fewest turnovers made in a game with 6 during their second-round match against UP .

Roster

Depth chart

Roster changes 
Cameroonian center Steve Akomo has used up his eligibility but is ably replaced by the Beninese Soulémane Chabi Yo, a transferee from Colegio de San Lorenzo who led the Griffins to the 2017 UCBL championship.

Mario Bonleon and Season 81 team captain Marvin Lee decided to forego their final playing year to join the commercial leagues. Bonleon announced to the team that he was not coming back due to recurring injuries. He had made his decision before the Tigers played their last game of the season. Lee was the team's second leading scorer last season behind Renzo Subido and had played long minutes in UST's preseason games but was advised by their head coach to pursue playing in the MPBL in lieu of his final year in college. His Season 81 scoring average was 14.4 points per game.

Germy Mahinay and Joshua Marcos also played in the preseason, but both decided to transfer to other schools with Mahinay going to National University and Marcos to College of Saint Benilde. Toby Agustin, who saw limited action last season also transferred to Mapúa University.

Aldin Ayo's twofold rebuilding plan to hold on to players from the UST high school program and to find talents from the countryside could not be any more evident this season with the arrival of UST Tiger Cubs' mythical team member Mark Nonoy, La Union native Rhenz Abando, and Davao City rookie standout Deo Cuajao.

Nonoy himself was scouted while he was in his junior year at Hua Siong College in Iloilo. He was representing Western Visayas in the Palarong Pambansa where he scored 43 points in a game against the Northern Mindanao team. He earlier scored 41 points for Hua Siong in their championship win over Bacolod Tay Tung High School in the 2018 Iloilo Invitational 17 Under Boys Basketball tournament.

Subtractions

Additions

Recruiting class

Coaching staff 
Aldin Ayo went into his second year as the head coach of the Growling Tigers, but not without controversies. A rumor that originated from an anonymous tweet in April claimed that Ayo had been fired as coach of the Growling Tigers, but UST's school publication, The Varsitarian later clarified that he was actually giving up his post as consultant of the juniors' basketball program to concentrate on rebuilding the seniors' team.

This led Bonnie Garcia to step down from the seniors' coaching staff to replace Ayo in the juniors' program. Garcia is the coach of the UST Tiger Cubs basketball team that placed fifth in Season 81 on a 7–7 win–loss record.

The Varsitarian further clarified that Ayo had actually signed a three-year contract and not six years as reported last year.

Aside from Garcia, assistant coach Randy Alcantara also left Ayo's coaching staff after he was selected by the Mapúa University Cardinals senior men's basketball team in December 2018 to replace Atoy Co as their new head coach. Alcantara was the coach of Mapúa's juniors' team who had just won their third straight NCAA championship earlier in November.

Tapped to replace Garcia and Alcantara were former Arellano Baby Chiefs player JR Carlos and former captain of the Growling Tigers Jino Manansala.

Jino, the son of former Philippine Basketball Association Rookie of the Year Jimmy Manansala played under Coach Aric del Rosario alongside Cyrus Baguio, Niño Gelig, Alwyn Espiritu, Christian Luanzon and Emmerson Oreta. He is the current head coach of reigning NAASCU champions Saint Clare College of Caloocan. He has also coached the AMA University Titans and the University of Manila Hawks to the 2006 and 2010 NAASCU championships.

This season also saw a change in the team manager position with Jimi Lim of Ironcon Builders replacing Chuck Dumlao of FMR Corporation.

Schedule and results

Preseason tournaments 

The Filoil Preseason Cup and the PBA D-League games were aired on 5 Plus and ESPN 5.

UAAP games 

Elimination games were played in a double round-robin format. All games were aired on ABS-CBN Sports and Action and Liga.

Postseason tournament 

The games of the Philippine Collegiate Champions League were aired via livestreaming on Facebook and YouTube.

Notes

UAAP statistics

Eliminations 

|- bgcolor=#ffffdd
| Soulémane Chabi Yo || 14 || 14 || style=|31.3 || 94 || 182 || 51.6% || 0 || 8 || 0.0% || 49 || 70 || 70.0% || style=|14.7 || 1.3 || 0.6 || 0.9 || 1.5 || style=|16.9
|-
| Rhenz Abando || 13 || 5 || 22.3 || 53 || 148 || 35.8% || 32 || 104 || 30.8% || 21 || 37 || 56.8% || 5.0 || 1.0 || style=|0.7 || style=|1.2 || 2.2 || 12.2
|- bgcolor=#ffffdd
| Mark Nonoy || 14 || 6 || 20.7 || 42 || 145 || 29.0% || 26 || 98 || 26.5% || 34 || 51 || 66.7% || 3.9 || 2.3 || style=|0.7 || 0.0 || 2.3 || 10.0
|-
| Renzo Subido || 14 || 9 || 22.0 || 38 || 94 || 40.4% || 20 || 56 || 35.7% || 19 || 27 || 70.4% || 2.1 || style=|3.5 || 0.2 || 0.0 || 1.3 || 8.2
|- bgcolor=#ffffdd
| Sherwin Concepcion || 14 || 3 || 16.7 || 33 || 109 || 30.3% || 25 || 74 || 33.8% || 14 || 17 || style=|82.4% || 4.4 || 0.9 || 0.1 || 0.0 || 0.6 || 7.5
|-
| Brent Paraiso || 14 || 10 || 20.6 || 34 || 94 || 36.2% || 19 || 62 || 30.6% || 6 || 13 || 46.2% || 4.4 || 1.7 || 0.6 || 0.1 || 2.1 || 6.6
|- bgcolor=#ffffdd
| CJ Cansino || 14 || 8 || 17.2 || 31 || 82 || 37.8% || 13 || 41 || 31.7% || 10 || 17 || 58.8% || 4.3 || 1.6 || 0.6 || 0.2 || 1.6 || 6.1
|-
| Zach Huang || 14 || 4 || 14.8 || 29 || 65 || 44.6% || 12 || 26 || 46.2% || 13 || 24 || 54.2% || 3.9 || 0.9 || 0.1 || 0.0 || 0.9 || 5.9
|- bgcolor=#ffffdd
| Dave Ando || 14 || 1 || 12.5 || 20 || 46 || 43.5% || 1 || 2 || style=|50.0% || 3 || 6 || 50.0% || 3.1 || 0.6 || 0.1 || 0.4 || 0.3 || 3.1
|-
| Ira Bataller || 13 || 9 || 16.8 || 8 || 37 || 21.6% || 0 || 6 || 0.0% || 11 || 21 || 52.4% || 2.9 || 1.1 || 0.1 || 0.0 || 1.5 || 2.1
|- bgcolor=#ffffdd
| Nat Cosejo || 4 || 0 || 2.3 || 2 || 3 || 66.7% || 0 || 0 || 0.0% || 1 || 2 || 50.0% || 0.5 || 0.0 || 0.0 || 0.0 || 0.0 || 1.3
|-
| Deo Cuajao || 11 || 1 || 5.8 || 5 || 24 || 20.8% || 3 || 14 || 21.4% || 0 || 0 || 0.0% || 1.0 || 0.4 || 0.0 || 0.0 || 0.3 || 1.2
|- bgcolor=#ffffdd
| Migs Pangilinan || 4 || 0 || 3.1 || 1 || 1 || style=|100.0% || 0 || 0 || 0.0% || 0 || 0 || 0.0% || 0.8 || 0.0 || 0.0 || 0.0 || 0.0 || 0.5
|-
| Albert Bordeos || 6 || 0 || 4.7 || 0 || 7 || 0.0% || 0 || 4 || 0.0% || 1 || 2 || 50.0% || 0.5 || 1.5 || 0.0 || 0.0 || 0.7 || 0.2
|- bgcolor=#ffffdd
| Enric Caunan || 2 || 0 || 5.4 || 0 || 0 || 0.0% || 0 || 0 || 0.0% || 0 || 0 || 0.0% || 1.0 || 1.0 || 0.0 || 0.0 || 0.0 || 0.0
|-
| Junjun Asuncion || 1 || 0 || 3.3 || 0 || 1 || 0.0% || 0 || 1 || 0.0% || 0 || 0 || 0.0% || 0.0 || 0.0 || 0.0 || 0.0 || 0.0 || 0.0
|- class=sortbottom
! Total || 14 ||  || 40.4 || 387 || 1,038 || 37.3% || 151 || 498 || 30.3% || 184 || 287 || 64.1% || 49.9 || 15.9 || 3.7 || 2.8 || 15.4 || 79.2
|- class=sortbottom
! Opponents || 14 ||  || 40.4 || 402 || 1,011 || 39.8% || 114 || 374 || 30.5% || 141 || 238 || 59.2% || 45.1 || 15.5 || 4.9 || 3.1 || 14.7 || 75.6
|}

Playoffs 

|- bgcolor=#ffffdd
| Soulémane Chabi Yo || 5 || 5 || style=|32.1 || 35 || 65 || style=|53.8% || 0 || 3 || 0.0% || 18 || 28 || 64.3% || style=|14.2 || 1.6 || style=|1.0 || 0.4 || 1.8 || style=|17.6
|-
| Mark Nonoy || 5 || 0 || 22.6 || 23 || 67 || 34.3% || 13 || 45 || 28.9% || 15 || 20 || 75.0% || 4.2 || 4.6 || 0.8 || 0.0 || 2.6 || 14.8
|- bgcolor=#ffffdd
| Rhenz Abando || 5 || 1 || 24.4 || 15 || 42 || 35.7% || 9 || 29 || 31.0% || 17 || 27 || 63.0% || 5.8 || 0.0 || 0.6 || style=|1.8 || 0.6 || 11.2
|-
| Renzo Subido || 5 || 5 || 24.6 || 19 || 53 || 35.8% || 14 || 46 || 30.4% || 0 || 1 || 0.0% || 2.2 || style=|4.8 || 0.4 || 0.0 || 3.2 || 10.4
|- bgcolor=#ffffdd
| Brent Paraiso || 5 || 4 || 21.2 || 13 || 39 || 33.3% || 9 || 28 || 32.1% || 6 || 10 || 60.0% || 2.6 || 0.6 || 0.4 || 0.0 || 2.6 || 8.2
|-
| Sherwin Concepcion || 5 || 0 || 12.3 || 8 || 27 || 29.6% || 7 || 23 || 30.4% || 2 || 2 || style=|100.0% || 1.6 || 0.8 || 0.0 || 0.0 || 0.4 || 5.0
|- bgcolor=#ffffdd
| CJ Cansino || 5 || 5 || 20.4 || 8 || 32 || 25.0% || 0 || 8 || 0.0% || 7 || 8 || 87.5% || 7.8 || 2.8 || 0.6 || 0.2 || 1.2 || 4.6
|-
| Dave Ando || 5 || 1 || 11.4 || 7 || 15 || 46.7% || 0 || 1 || 0.0% || 1 || 2 || 50.0% || 2.0 || 0.4 || 0.0 || 0.8 || 1.0 || 3.0
|- bgcolor=#ffffdd
| Zach Huang || 5 || 0 || 13.0 || 4 || 17 || 23.5% || 1 || 7 || 14.3% || 6 || 9 || 66.7% || 3.0 || 0.6 || 0.0 || 0.0 || 1.0 || 3.0
|-
| Ira Bataller || 5 || 4 || 17.0 || 2 || 8 || 25.0% || 1 || 2 || style=|50.0% || 0 || 0 || 0.0% || 2.6 || 1.0 || 0.0 || 0.0 || 1.2 || 1.0
|- bgcolor=#ffffdd
| Deo Cuajao || 1 || 0 || 2.3 || 0 || 0 || 0.0% || 0 || 0 || 0.0% || 0 || 0 || 0.0% || 0.0 || 0.0 || 0.0 || 0.0 || 0.0 || 0.0
|-
| Migs Pangilinan || 1 || 0 || 3.1 || 0 || 0 || 0.0% || 0 || 0 || 0.0% || 0 || 0 || 0.0% || 0.0 || 0.0 || 0.0 || 0.0 || 0.0 || 0.0
|- class=sortbottom
! Total || 5 ||  || 40.0 || 134 || 365 || 36.7% || 54 || 192 || 28.1% || 72 || 105 || 68.6% || 46.2 || 17.2 || 3.8 || 3.2 || 17.0 || 78.8
|- class=sortbottom
! Opponents || 5 ||  || 40.0 || 149 || 362 || 41.2% || 39 || 141 || 27.7% || 45 || 71 || 63.4% || 44.8 || 15.4 || 5.0 || 3.0 || 16.2 || 76.4
|}

Source: Imperium Technology

Awards

Players drafted into the PBA 
Renzo Subido was drafted 24th overall in the second round of the 2019 PBA draft by the Pido Jarencio-led NorthPort Batang Pier.

References 

2019–20 in Philippine college basketball
UST Growling Tigers basketball team seasons